Michael Francis Conry (April 2, 1870 – March 2, 1917) was an American newspaperman, lawyer, and politician who served four terms as a U.S. Representative from New York from 1909 to 1917.

Biography 
Born in Shenandoah, Pennsylvania, Conry attended the public schools,  and was employed in the coal mines until sustaining an injury which crushed his ankles and left him crippled.  He taught school for seven years, and also worked as an accountant and a newspaper reporter.

After deciding on a career as an attorney, he graduated from the University of Michigan Law School  in 1896, was admitted to the bar and commenced practice in Scranton, Pennsylvania. He was an unsuccessful candidate for election in 1900 to the Fifty-seventh Congress.

He later moved to New York City and resumed the practice of law, including two years as the city's assistant corporation counsel.

Congress 
Conry was elected as a Democrat to the Sixty-first Congress.  He was reelected to the three succeeding Congresses and served from March 4, 1909, until his death.

Death 
Conry suffered from Bright's disease, a classification of kidney disease that would be described in modern medicine as acute or chronic nephritis, and became ill in late 1916.  He died in Washington, D.C., on March 2, 1917, and was interred at Calvary Cemetery in Maspeth, Queens.

Family 
He was married to Katherine O'Boyle of Scranton, and they were the parents of three daughters.

See also 
 List of United States Congress members who died in office (1900–49)

References 

Michael F. Conry (Late a Representative from New York), by U.S. Government Printing Office

External links
 

1870 births
1917 deaths
Burials at Calvary Cemetery (Queens)
University of Michigan Law School alumni
Pennsylvania lawyers
New York (state) lawyers
Pennsylvania Democrats
Democratic Party members of the United States House of Representatives from New York (state)
19th-century American politicians
19th-century American lawyers
Members of the United States House of Representatives from New York (state)